The term "short-arm inspection" is a military euphemism referring to the routine medical inspection of male soldiers' penises ("short arms") for signs of sexually-transmitted diseases and other medical problems.

The precise origin of the term is uncertain; however, American and Australian troops are known to have used the term during the First World War.

Examples
The practice within the Imperial Japanese Army during World War 2 was described by an anonymous American soldier, who had been forced to work as a truck driver while held as a prisoner of war, and who came into daily close contact with Japanese soldiers.

References

Euphemisms
Military life
Sexual health